Thomas Renner (born 24 December 1967) is an Austrian sprinter. He competed in the men's 4 × 100 metres relay at the 1992 Summer Olympics.

References

1967 births
Living people
Athletes (track and field) at the 1992 Summer Olympics
Austrian male sprinters
Olympic athletes of Austria
Place of birth missing (living people)